Alba Ribas Benaiges (born 5 January 1988) is a Spanish actress born in Catalonia. She is best known for her role in The Corpse of Anna Fritz, in which she played the title role. In 2017, she appeared in the Netflix series Las Chicas Del Cable.

Filmography

Films 
 Diary of a Nymphomaniac (2008)
 Paranormal Xperience 3D (2011) as Diana
 Barcelona, noche de verano (2013) as Catherine
 The Corpse of Anna Fritz (2015) as Anna
 100 metros (2016) as Ariadna
 Te Quiero, Imbécil (2020)

Television  
 El barco (2011-2013) 11 episodes, as Sol / Elena Torres
 El ministerio del tiempo (2016) 1 episode, as Constanza
 Cites (2016) 3 episodes as Sara.
 La que se avecina (2016) 1 episode, Andrea's roommate.
 Cable Girls (2017) 2 episodes, as Jimena. Netflix series 
 Derecho a soñar (2019) 130 episodes, as Julia Rojas

Music video 
 El Bosc (2009) from grupo Ix!
 Mudas y Escamas (2014) from grupo Sr. Chinarro
Ella té un cel als ulls (2015) by Roger Mas
La Distancia (Un Nuevo Significado) (2021) of Macaco and Rozalén

Theater 
 La ola (2015) as Sherry

References

External links
 
 

Living people
Spanish film actresses
Place of birth missing (living people)
1988 births
21st-century Spanish actresses